Giuseppe Martinelli (born 11 March 1955) is a retired road bicycle racer from Italy, who was a professional rider from 1977 to 1985. He represented his native country at the 1976 Summer Olympics in Montreal, Quebec, Canada, where he won silver medal in the men's individual road race behind Sweden's Bernt Johansson. In 2011, Martinelli became the manager of the  cycling team, replacing Yvon Sanquer.

References

External links
 

1955 births
Living people
Italian male cyclists
Cyclists at the 1976 Summer Olympics
Olympic cyclists of Italy
Olympic silver medalists for Italy
Italian Giro d'Italia stage winners
Italian Vuelta a España stage winners
Cyclists from the Province of Brescia
Olympic medalists in cycling
Medalists at the 1976 Summer Olympics